In enzymology, a histidine transaminase is an enzyme that catalyzes the chemical reaction

L-histidine + 2-oxoglutarate  (imidazol-5-yl)pyruvate + L-glutamate

Thus, the two substrates of this enzyme are L-histidine and 2-oxoglutarate, whereas its two products are (imidazol-5-yl)pyruvate and L-glutamate.

This enzyme belongs to the family of transferases, specifically the transaminases, which transfer nitrogenous groups.  The systematic name of this enzyme class is L-histidine:2-oxoglutarate aminotransferase. Other names in common use include histidine aminotransferase, and histidine-2-oxoglutarate aminotransferase.  This enzyme participates in histidine metabolism.

References

 
 

EC 2.6.1
Enzymes of unknown structure